Storm Lake may refer to:

Places
Storm Lake, Iowa

Lakes
Storm Lake (Colorado), a lake in Boulder County, Colorado
Little Storm Lake (Colorado), a lake in Boulder County, Colorado
Storm Lake (Idaho), a lake in Idaho County, Idaho
Storm Peak Lake, a lake in Valley County, Idaho
Storm Lake (Iowa), a lake in Buena Vista County, Iowa
Little Storm Lake (Iowa), a small lake in Buena Vista County, Iowa
Storm Lake (Minnesota), a lake in Blue Earth County, Minnesota
 Storm Lake, a lake in Stillwater County, Montana
 Storm Lake in Deer Lodge County, Montana
Red Storm Lake, a lake in Carbon County, Montana
Storm Lake (North Dakota), a lake in Sargent County, North Dakota
Storm Lake (Oregon), a lake in Klamath County, Oregon
Little Storm Lake (Oregon), a lake in Wallowa County, Oregon
Storm Lake (Washington), a lake in Snohomish County, Washington
Storm Lake (Wisconsin), a lake in Waupaca County, Wisconsin

Sources
United States Geological Survey, Geographical Names Information System